State Road 15, is an IB-class road in northern Serbia, connecting Hungary at Bački Breg with Romania at Nakovo. It is located in Vojvodina.

Before the new road categorization regulation given in 2013, the route wore the following names: M 18, P 101, M 3 and P 114 (before 2012) / 28, 19, 104, 11 and 100 (after 2012).

The existing route is a main road with two traffic lanes. By the valid Space Plan of Republic of Serbia the road is not planned for upgrading to motorway, and is expected to be conditioned in its current state.

Section from Bezdan to Sombor is a part of European route E662.

Sections

See also 
 Roads in Serbia
 European route E662

References

External links 
 Official website – Roads of Serbia (Putevi Srbije)
 Official website – Corridors of Serbia (Koridori Srbije) (Serbian)

State roads in Serbia